There are at least 7 named lakes and reservoirs in Dallas County, Arkansas.

Lakes
 Shell Lake, el.  
 Long Lake, el.  
 Round Lake, el.  
 Horseshoe Lake, el.

Reservoirs
 Lake Lansdale, el.  
 Jacobs Lake, el.  
 Kervin Lake Number One, el.

See also

 List of lakes in Arkansas

Notes

Bodies of water of Dallas County, Arkansas
Dallas